Muhammad Hazim Faiz bin Hassan (born 28 September 1995 in Singapore) is a Singaporean footballer.

Career
During his time in the Singapore Sports School, Faiz almost gave up football after constant criticism from coach Abdullah Noor.

References

External links
 Hazim Faiz at Soccerway

Singaporean footballers
Association football forwards
Living people
1995 births